BRV may refer to:

 Baboon orthoreovirus
 Constitution of the German Empire (Bismarcksche Reichsverfassung)
 Blue River virus, an RNA virus
 Bournville railway station in England
 Brașov Airport, Romania, IATA code
 Bremerhaven Airport, a former airfield in Germany, IATA code
 Western Bru, an Austroasiatic language of Thailand, ISO 639 code 
 Honda BR-V, a vehicle
 Bolivarian Republic of Venezuela